Beaumont (Auvergnat: Biaumont) is a commune in the Puy-de-Dôme department in Auvergne-Rhône-Alpes in central France. The commune lies to the south of the dormant volcano, the Puy-de-Dôme (10 km from the commune and the city) which is clearly visible, including the telecommunication antennas that sit on its top.

Population

Personalities
Born in Beaumont:
 Audrey Tautou (9 August 1976), actress
 Annelise Hesme (born 11 May 1976), actress
 Aurélien Rougerie (born 24 September 1980), rugby union player, member of the French national team

See also
 Communes of the Puy-de-Dôme department

References

External links
 Town hall website (in French)

Communes of Puy-de-Dôme